Rotella is a comune (municipality) in the Province of Ascoli Piceno in the Italian region Marche, located about  south of Ancona and about  north of Ascoli Piceno.

The municipality of Rotella contains the frazioni (subdivisions, mainly villages and hamlets) Castel di Croce, Capradosso, and Poggio Canoso.

Rotella borders the following municipalities: Ascoli Piceno, Castignano, Force, Montedinove, Montelparo, Venarotta.

Among the prominent public buildings in Rotella are:
Torre Civica dell'Orologio
Museo Piccolomini, Rotella
Santi Maria e Lorenzo
Sanctuary of the Madonna della Consolazione, Montemisio
Santa Lucia di Capradosso
Santa Lucia di Poggio Canoso
San Severino
Santa Viviana or Chiesa delle Icone

Demographic evolution

References

External links

www.comunerotella.net/

Cities and towns in the Marche